Michael Easton (27 November 1954 – 6 February 2004) was a British-Australian composer, musician, and music critic. He was a co-founder of the Port Fairy Spring Music Festival.

Easton was born in Stevenage and (after encouragement from Elizabeth Poston) trained at the Royal Academy of Music with Lennox Berkeley (composition) and Norman Del Mar (conducting). He worked in music publishing before moving to Melbourne, Australia in 1982, where in 1986 he became a freelance composer. His activities included arranging, performing (in a piano duo with Len Vorster) and writing and broadcasting on music. With Vorster and the English composer Michael Hurd he co-founded the Port Fairy Spring Music Festival in 1990.

Easton and Michael Atkinson were nominated for the 1994 ARIA Award for Best Original Soundtrack, Cast or Show Album for their music to the Australian TV series Snowy. A Naxos CD issued in 1998 includes recordings of five of his orchestral works: Concerto on Australian Themes (1996), An Australian in Paris (1995), Beasts of the Bush (1995), the Concerto for Piano Accordion, Piano and Strings (1996, for Bernadette Conlon) and Overture to an Italianate Comedy. His other works include three symphonies, nine operas – including several children's operas, such as The Emperor's New Clothes (1993), and The Selfish Giant (1995) – and a successful musical, Dorothy Parker Says (1993). 

A Voice Not Stilled, a concerto for piano and orchestra on a fragment of music recovered from a victim of the holocaust, was premiered in July 2000. He scored the short comedy film The Moment of Accepting Life, shown at the 2001 Cannes International Film Festival. He died on 6 February 2004, one day after suffering a fall.

Awards and nominations

ARIA Music Awards
The ARIA Music Awards is an annual awards ceremony that recognises excellence, innovation, and achievement across all genres of Australian music. They commenced in 1987. 

! 
|-
| 1994
| Snowy (with Michael Atkinson)
| Best Original Soundtrack, Cast or Show Album
| 
| 
|-

References

External links
Michael Easton (1954-2004) : Represented Artist at Australian Music Centre

1954 births
2004 deaths
20th-century classical pianists
20th-century British male musicians
Australian male composers
British male composers
Australian music critics
British music critics
Australian classical pianists
Male classical pianists
British classical pianists